The 1994–95 season was PAOK Football Club's 68th in existence and the club's 36th consecutive season in the top flight of Greek football. The team entered the Greek Football Cup in first round. By finishing 3rd in the league, PAOK would normally qualify for the next season's UEFA Cup, but Apollon Athens who finished 4th replaced them, because the club was carrying a 1-year ban from European competitions after being charged by UEFA for the eventful match against Paris Saint-Germain on 1 October 1992. PAOK conceded only 3 goals in 17 matches at home during the 1994–95 Alpha Ethniki.

Players

Squad

Transfers

Players transferred in

Players transferred out

Kit

Pre-season

Competitions

Overview

Alpha Ethniki

Standings

Results summary

Results by round

• Matches are in chronological order

Matches

Greek Cup

First round (group stage)

Second round

Statistics

Squad statistics

! colspan="13" style="background:#DCDCDC; text-align:center" | Goalkeepers
|-

! colspan="13" style="background:#DCDCDC; text-align:center" | Defenders
|-

! colspan="13" style="background:#DCDCDC; text-align:center" | Midfielders
|-

! colspan="13" style="background:#DCDCDC; text-align:center" | Forwards
|-

|}	

Source: Match reports in competitive matches, rsssf.com

Goalscorers

Source: Match reports in competitive matches, rsssf.com

External links
 www.rsssf.com
 PAOK FC official website

References 

PAOK FC seasons
PAOK